Christopher Jake Crum (born September 25, 1991) is an American professional stock car racing driver.

Racing career
Through 2006, Crum captured multiple National Championships through the WKA, IKF, and INEX organizations. In 2007, Crum became the youngest driver to win a UARA-Stars Late Model Touring Series event at the age of 15. In 2008, Crum set the bar one notch higher by clinching the UARA-Stars Championship driving for the family-owned operation.

Economic pressures forced Crum to run a partial schedule in 2009. The mixed schedule included Crum's ARCA Racing Series debut, which resulted in a 6th-place finish at Mansfield Motorsports Park. Crum also debuted in the Pro All Stars Series South division with a 2nd-place finish at Newport Speedway.

On October 4, 2009, Crum became the youngest winner in the history of the annual Bailey's 300 held at the iconic Martinsville Speedway. The victory served as a crowning achievement for the aspiring driver, who turned 18 just nine days prior to the event. Competing against some of the most well-funded Late Model Stock Car operations in the country, Crum overcame the odds by pulling off an impressive victory by dominating the second half of the event. There were 83 cars that took to the track in an attempt to make the 43 car field.

NASCAR K&N Pro Series East
Crum entered two NASCAR K&N Pro Series East events in 2010. The season opener at Greenville-Pickens Speedway ended in disappointment, as a fuel line broke on a lap 49 restart while Crum was running in the 7th position. During the Martinsville event, Crum led 18 laps in an impressive showing before falling victim to a late-race caution prior to rain bring a halt to the event.

NASCAR Camping World Truck Series
Crum made his NASCAR Camping World Truck Series debut at the Bristol Motor Speedway on August 18, 2010 during the O'Reilly 200. Crum drove the #21 SS-Green Light Racing entry and was featured as a SPEED Spotlight driver. Crum qualified 13th for the event and was running as high as 7th when contact with his teammate sent him to the pits for repair. After working on the truck, Crum was making his way back through the field when the fuel pump gave out, ending his night.

In 2012, Crum drove the JJC Racing No. 0 Dodge with sponsorship from Bandit Chippers in the series' season-opening race at Daytona International Speedway.

In the 2014 North Carolina Education Lottery 200 at Charlotte Motor Speedway, Crum and Ryan Ellis were involved in an incident, and later in the race, Crum turned Ellis into the wall. His license was restored June 20.

Charity
Crum has partnered with the Greyhound Rescue Foundation of Tennessee for the 2010 season to help promote the adoption of retired racing greyhounds. The GRFT organization is based in Knoxville, Tennessee and operates throughout Northeast Tennessee.

Motorsports career results

NASCAR
(key) (Bold – Pole position awarded by qualifying time. Italics – Pole position earned by points standings or practice time. * – Most laps led.)

Nationwide Series

Camping World Truck Series

 Season still in progress 
 Ineligible for series championship points

K&N Pro Series East

ARCA Racing Series
(key) (Bold – Pole position awarded by qualifying time. Italics – Pole position earned by points standings or practice time. * – Most laps led.)

References

External links
 
 

Living people
1991 births
People from Statesville, North Carolina
Racing drivers from North Carolina
NASCAR drivers
ARCA Menards Series drivers
World Karting Association drivers
People from Newport, Tennessee
Racing drivers from Tennessee